The Union Beach School System is a community public school district that serves students in pre-kindergarten through eighth grade from Union Beach, in Monmouth County, New Jersey, United States.

As of the 2019–20 school year, the district, comprised of one school, had an enrollment of 640 students and 61.7 classroom teachers (on an FTE basis), for a student–teacher ratio of 10.4:1.

The district is classified by the New Jersey Department of Education as being in District Factor Group "CD", the sixth-highest of eight groupings. District Factor Groups organize districts statewide to allow comparison by common socioeconomic characteristics of the local districts. From lowest socioeconomic status to highest, the categories are A, B, CD, DE, FG, GH, I and J.

Public school students in ninth through twelfth grades attend Keyport High School in Keyport, as part of a sending/receiving relationship with the Keyport Public Schools. As of the 2019–20 school year, the high school had an enrollment of 373 students and 36.5 classroom teachers (on an FTE basis), for a student–teacher ratio of 10.2:1. Students have the choice, as well, to apply for Red Bank Regional High School for admission into its specialized programs.

School
Union Beach Memorial School had an enrollment of 627 students in grades PreK–8 as of the 2019–20 school year.
Kelly Savicky, Principal

Administration
Core members of the district's administration are:
Amanda Lewart, Superintendent
George Gahles, Business Administrator / Board Secretary

Board of education
The district's board of education has nine members who set policy and oversee the fiscal and educational operation of the district through its administration. As a Type II school district, the board's trustees are elected directly by voters to serve three-year terms of office on a staggered basis, with three seats up for election each year held (since 2012) as part of the November general election. The board appoints a superintendent to oversee the day-to-day operation of the district.

References

External links
Union Beach School System

School Data for the Union Beach School System, National Center for Education Statistics

Union Beach, New Jersey
New Jersey District Factor Group CD
School districts in Monmouth County, New Jersey
Public K–8 schools in New Jersey